Paronellidae is a family of elongate-bodied springtails in the order Entomobryomorpha. There are about 18 genera and at least 90 described species in Paronellidae.

Genera
These 18 genera belong to the family Paronellidae:

 Callyntrura Börner, 1906 g
 Campylothorax Schött, 1893 g
 Cyphoderopsis Carpenter, 1917 g
 Cyphoderus Nicolet, 1842 i c g b
 Glacialoca c g
 Lepidonella Yosii, 1960 g
 Metacoelura Salmon, 1951 g
 Micronellides c g
 Parachaetoceras c g
 Paronana c g
 Paronella Schött, 1893 g
 Paronellides c g
 Plumachaetas Salmon, 1951 g
 Pseudoparonella c g
 Pseudoparonellides c g
 Salina Macgillivray, 1894 i c g b
 Troglopedetes Absolon, 1907 g
 Trogolaphysa Mills, 1938 g

Data sources: i = ITIS, c = Catalogue of Life, g = GBIF, b = Bugguide.net

References

Further reading

External links

 

Collembola
Arthropod families